Michael William McConnell (born May 18, 1955) is an American constitutional law scholar who served as a United States circuit judge of the United States Court of Appeals for the Tenth Circuit from 2002 to 2009. Since 2009, McConnell has been a professor and Director of the Stanford Constitutional Law Center at Stanford Law School. He is also a senior fellow at Stanford University's Hoover Institution, and Senior Of Counsel to the Litigation Practice Group at Wilson Sonsini Goodrich & Rosati. In May 2020, Facebook appointed him to its content oversight board. In 2020, McConnell published The President Who Would Not Be King: Executive Power under the Constitution by Princeton University Press.

Biography
McConnell graduated from Michigan State University's James Madison College with a Bachelor of Arts degree in 1976. He received his Juris Doctor (J.D.) from the University of Chicago Law School in 1979, where he was an editor of the University of Chicago Law Review. He was a law clerk for J. Skelly Wright, United States Court of Appeals for the District of Columbia Circuit from 1979 to 1980 and for United States Supreme Court justice William J. Brennan Jr., from 1980 to 1981. He was an assistant general counsel at the Office of Management and Budget from 1981 to 1983 and an assistant to the Solicitor General from 1983 to 1985. From 1985 to 1996 McConnell was a professor at the University of Chicago Law School, where he brought Barack Obama on a fellowship after being impressed with a suggestion Obama, the Harvard Law Review president, had made about one of McConnell's articles. He has been a professor at the University of Utah S.J. Quinney College of Law and a visiting professor at Harvard Law School and the New York University School of Law.

Scholarship

As a law professor, McConnell has published a variety of legal articles and edited several books. As a lawyer, he has argued cases in federal courts of appeals and before the Supreme Court, including a 5–4 victory in Rosenberger v. University of Virginia. He is widely regarded as one of the preeminent constitutional law scholars on the Free Exercise and Establishment Clauses.

In 1996, McConnell signed a statement supporting a constitutional amendment to ban abortion, which read, "Abortion kills 1.5 million innocent human beings in America every year. ... We believe that the abortion license is a critical factor in America's virtue deficit."

As a respected constitutional scholar during his law school tenure, McConnell contended that originalism is consistent with the Supreme Court's 1954 desegregation decision Brown v. Board of Education, as opposed to critics of originalism who argue that they are inconsistent. He has likewise argued that the Court's decision in Bolling v. Sharpe was correct but should have been reached on other grounds, as Congress never "required that the schools of the District of Columbia be segregated."

McConnell was highly critical of the Supreme Court's decision in Bush v. Gore:

I imagine that Gov. Bush and his supporters will put on a brave face and defend this decision, but I cannot imagine that there is much joy in Austin tonight. The Supreme Court, with all the prestige of its position in American public life, could have brought closure to this matter. But instead, by straddling the fence, the court has produced a combination of holdings that can please no one.McConnell expressed skepticism on First Amendment grounds about restrictions on religious exercise imposed during the COVID-19 pandemic.

In 2021, McConnell's argument that Trump could be tried by the Senate after he left office because the second impeachment occurred while he was in office was frequently cited in Senate debates and in the media.

Federal judicial service

On September 4, 2001, President George W. Bush nominated McConnell to the United States Court of Appeals for the Tenth Circuit. The United States Senate confirmed him unanimously on November 15, 2002, by voice vote. He received his commission on November 26, 2002. He resigned from the bench on August 31, 2009.

Notable cases
While on the Tenth Circuit, McConnell wrote scores of judicial opinions. The Supreme Court reviewed four cases in which McConnell wrote an opinion; in each case the Court reached the same result as McConnell. First, in Gonzales v. O Centro Espirita Beneficente Uniao do Vegetal (2006), a case involving the religious use of a hallucinogenic tea, the Supreme Court affirmed 8–0 a Tenth Circuit en banc decision to which Judge McConnell wrote a concurring opinion. Second, in Fernandez-Vargas v. Gonzales (2008), a case involving the retroactive application of a statutory provision limiting appeals from immigration removal orders, the Supreme Court affirmed 8–1 a Tenth Circuit panel decision written by Judge McConnell. Third, in Begay v. United States (2008), a case about whether a felony conviction for driving under the influence is a crime of violence for purposes of the Armed Career Criminal Act, the Supreme Court reversed 6–3 a Tenth Circuit panel decision from which McConnell dissented. Fourth, in Pleasant Grove City v. Summum (2009), a case involving whether the presence of a Ten Commandments monument on government property gave another religion a First Amendment right to place its own monument on the same property, the Supreme Court unanimously reversed a Tenth Circuit panel decision that McConnell had challenged by writing a dissent from the denial of rehearing en banc.

Significant opinions by McConnell include:
 Christian Heritage Academy v. Oklahoma Secondary School Activities Association, 483 F.3d 1025, 1037 (2007) (concurring and dissenting). Equal Protection Clause.
 United States v. Pruitt (2007) (concurring). Criminal sentencing.
 United States v. Allen (2007). Criminal sentencing. The case was covered by How Appealing and Decision of the Day.
 United States v. Medley (2007) (concurring). Criminal sentencing.
 Shrum v. City of Coweta, Oklahoma, 449 F.3d 1132 (2007). Free Exercise Clause.
 O Centro Espirita Beneficiente Uniao do Vegetal v. Ashcroft, 389 F.3d 973 (2004) (en banc) (McConnell, J., concurring), affirmed by Gonzales v. O Centro Espirita Beneficente Uniao do Vegetal, 546 U.S. 418 (2006). Free Exercise Clause; Religious Freedom Restoration Act.
 Geddes v. United Staffing Alliance Employee Medical Plan (2006).
 United States v. Patton (2006). Commerce Clause. Writing for the court, McConnell upheld a federal statute prohibiting the possession of body armor by felons. Even though the statute, as applied to Patton's intrastate and noncommercial possession of body armor, could not be sustained under any of the three Lopez categories the Supreme Court established, it fell within the Commerce Clause under another line of Supreme Court precedent (Scarborough) and noted the tension between the two sets of precedents. The court also rejected Patton's due process and necessity claims. The case was covered by Decision of the Day and The Volokh Conspiracy and was the subject of a constitutional law final exam at Cornell.
 Equal Employment Opportunity Commission v. BCI Coca-Cola.
 Southern Utah Wilderness Alliance v. Bureau of Land Management (2006).

Supreme Court speculation

McConnell was mentioned as a potential nominee to the Supreme Court during the Bush administration. In June 2005, amid expectations that Chief Justice William H. Rehnquist would retire at the end of the Court's term, some sources cited McConnell as a frontrunner for Rehnquist's seat, which ultimately went to John Roberts. Professor Stephen B. Presser of Northwestern University School of Law argued that McConnell was "high on the White House's short list" because:

 [McConnell] does believe that the Supreme Court has gone too far in reading the total separation of church and state into the Constitution, and because he ... understands that Roe v. Wade has no firm constitutional foundation. He might be acceptable to the left not only because so many liberal professors support him, but also because he has been public in his criticism of Bush v. Gore and the impeachment of President Clinton.

McConnell was also mentioned as a possible Supreme Court nominee in a John McCain or Mitt Romney presidency.

Testimony on constitutional term limits for Supreme Court justices  
On June 30, 2021, McConnell provided testimony to the Presidential Commission on the Supreme Court of the United States on the dangers of increasing the Court's size. He proposed a constitutional amendment to address such dangers, including an 18-year term limit on justices and appointment of a justice in each odd year, unless the Senate voted against the appointment.

Highlights of his testimony include: 
Any attempt to increase the size of the Court would be widely, and correctly, be regarded as a partisan interference with the independence of the Court....  It is no exaggeration to say that this would destroy one of the central features of our constitutional system, the independent judiciary.

This [McConnell’s] proposal, if adopted, would have several salutary effects. It would make the power of the president to name Supreme Court justices regular, fair, and consistent, and thus likely would lower the political stakes of each nomination. The political balance of the Court would reflect the opinions of the people over time as expressed in their choice of presidents and senators, rather than the happenstance of health or accident or the strategic timing of the justices.

See also
George W. Bush Supreme Court candidates

References

Further reading

 A selection of McConnell's essays for the Wall Street Journal
 McConnell's Faculty Profile at Stanford Law School

His academic scholarship includes, among other publications, the following:

 The Booker Mess, 83 Denv. U. L. Rev. 665 (2006).
 "Book Review: Active Liberty: A Progressive Alternative to Textualism and Originalism?", 119 Harv. L. Rev. 2387 (2006).
 The Ethics of Etiquette: An Introduction to a Symposium in Honor of Dean Lee E. Teitelbaum, 2006 Utah L. Rev. 1.
 Establishment and Disestablishment at the Founding, Part I: Establishment of Religion, 44 Wm. & Mary L. Rev. 2105 (2003).
 Religious Freedom, Separation of Powers, and the Reversal of Roles, 2001 BYU L. Rev. 611.
 Two-and-a-Half Cheers for Bush v. Gore, 68 U. Chi. L. Rev. 657 (2001).
 The Supreme Court's Earliest Church-State Cases:  Windows on Religious-Cultural-Political Conflict in the Early Republic, 37 Tulsa L. Rev. 7 (2001).
 State Action and the Supreme Court's Emerging Consensus on the Line between Establishment and Private *Religious Expression, 28 Pepp. L. Rev. 681 (2000).
 The Redistricting Cases:  Original Mistakes and Current Consequences, 24 Harv. J. L. & Pub. Pol'y 103 (2000).
 The Problem of Singling Out Religion, 50 DePaul L. Rev. 1 (2000).
 The New Establishmentarianism, 75 Chi.-Kent L. Rev. 453 (1999).
 Why is Religious Liberty the First Freedom, 21 Cardozo L. Rev. 1243 (1999).
 Five Reasons to Reject the Claim That Religious Arguments Should Be Excluded from Democratic Deliberation, 1999 Utah L. Rev. 639 (1999).
 Freedom From Persecution or Protection of the Rights of Conscience?: A Critique of Justice Scalia's Historical *Arguments in City of Boerne v. Flores, 39 William and Mary Law Review 819 (1998).
 Tradition and Constitutionalism before the Constitution, 1998 U. Ill. L. Rev. 173.
 Equal Treatment and Religious Discrimination in Equal Treatment of Religion in a Pluralistic Society, Stephen V. Monsma and J. Christopher Soper, eds. (William B. Eerdmans Publishing Co., 1998).
 Governments, Families, and Power:  A Defense of Educational Choice, 31 Conn. L. Rev. 847 (1998).
 Institutions and Interpretation: A Critique of City of Boerne v. Flores, 111 Harvard Law Review 153 (1997).
 The Importance of Humility in Judicial Review: A Comment on Ronald Dworkin's 'Moral Reading' of the Constitution, 65 Fordham Law Review 1269 (1997).
 "Believers As Equal Citizens," Law and Religion: Obligations of Democratic Citizenship and Demands of Faith Symposium, Brown University (April 1997).
 The Right to Die and the Jurisprudence of Tradition, 1997 Utah Law Review 665.
 Establishment and Toleration in Edmund Burke's "Constitution of Freedom" 1995 Supreme Court Review 393.
 Segregation and the Original Understanding—A Reply to Professor Maltz, 13 Constitutional Commentary 233 (1996).
 The Importance of Humility in Judicial Review:  A Comment on Ronald Dworkin's Moral Reading of the Constitution, 65 Fordham L. Rev. 1269 (1996).
 The Originalist Case for Brown v. Board of education, 19 Harv. J. L. & Pub. Pol'y 457 (1995).
 (May 1995).  
See also Response to McConnell:  
Response to Klarman by McConnell: (October 1995). 
 The Forgotten Constitutional Moment, 11 Const. Comment. 115 (1994).
 Doubtful Constitutionality of the Clinic Access Bill, 1 Va. J. Soc. Pol'y & L. 267 (1994) (with Michael Stokes Paulsen).
 Book review: Religion and the search for a principled middle ground on abortion, 92 Mich. L. Rev. 1893 (1994).
 Christ, Culture, and Courts:  A Nielbuhrian Examination of First Amendment Jurisprudence, 42 De Paul L. Rev. 191 (1993).
 God is Dead and We Have Killed Him:  Freedom of Religion in the Post-Modern Age, 1993 BYU L. Rev. 163.
 When Cities Go Broke: A Conceptual Introduction to Municipal Bankruptcy, 60 U. Chi. L. Rev. 425 (1993) (with Randal Picker).
 Accommodation of Religion:  An Update and a Response to the Critics, 60 Geo. Wash. L. Rev. 685 (1992).
 Should Congress Pass Legislation Restoring the Broader Interpretation of Free Exercise of Religion, 15 Harv. J. L. & Pub. Pol'y 181 (1992).
 Religious Participation in Public Programs – Religious Freedom at a Crossroads, 59 U. Chi. L. Rev. 115 (1992).
 The Fourteenth Amendment:  A Second American Revolution or the Logical Culmination of the Tradition, 25 Loy. L. A. L. Rev. 1159 (1991).
 Book review: How Not To Promote Serious Deliberation About Abortion, 58 U. Chi. L. Rev. 1181 (1991).
 A Response to Professor Marshall, 58 U. Chi. L. Rev. 329 (1991).
 Multiculturalism, Majoritarianism, and Educational Choice: What Does Our Constitutional Tradition Have to Say?, 1991 U. Chi. Legal F. 123 (1991).
 The Origins and Historical Understanding of the Free Exercise of Religion, 103 Harv. L. Rev. 1409 (1990).
 The Selective Funding Problem: Abortions and Religious Schools, 104 Harv. L. Rev. 989 (1990).
 Academic Freedom in Religious Colleges and Universities, 53 Law & Contemp. Probs. 303 (1990).
 Free Exercise Revisionism and the Smith Decision, 57 U. Chi. L. Rev. 1109 (1990).
 An Economic Approach to Issues of Religious Freedom, 56 U. Chi. L. Rev. 1 (1989) (with Richard A. Posner).
 Unconstitutional Conditions: Unrecognized Implications for the Establishment Clause, 26 San Diego L. Rev. 255 (1989).
 The Origins and Historical Understanding of Free Exercise of Religion, 103 Harv. L. Rev. 1409 (1989).
 Contract Rights and Property Rights: A Case Study in the Relationship between Individual Liberties and Constitutional Structure, 76 Cal. L. Rev. 267 (1988).
 A Moral Realist Defense of Constitutional Democracy, 64 Chi.-Kent L. Rev. 89 (1988).
 The Religion Clause of the First Amendment: Where Is The Supreme Court Heading?, 32 Cath. Law. 187 (1988).
 The First Amendment Jurisprudence of Judge Robert H. Bork, 9 Carozo L. Rev. 79 (1987).
 The Rule of Law and the Role of the Solicitor General, 21 Loy L. A. L. Rev. 1105 (1987).
 Why Hold Elections – Using Consent Decrees to Insulate Policies from Political Change, 1987 U. Chi. Legal F. 295 (1987).
 You Can't Tell the Players in Church-State Disputes without a Scorecard, 10 Harv. J. L. & Pub. Pol'y 27 (1987).
 On Reading the Constitution, 73 Cornell L. Rev. 359 (1987).
 Political and Religious Disestablishment, 1986 BYU L. Rev. 405 (1986).
 Neutrality under the Religion Clauses, 81 Nw. U. L. Rev. 146 (1986).
 Accommodation of Religion, 1985 Sup. Ct. Rev. 1.
 Coercion:  The Lost Element of Establishment, 27 Wm. & Mary L. Rev. 933 (1985).
 The Politics of Returning Power to the States, 6 Harv. J. L. & Pub. Pol'y 103 (1982).
 The Appealability of Orders Denying Motions for Disqualification of Counsel in the Federal Courts, 45 U. Chi. L. Rev. 450 (1977) (student note).

External links 
 
 
 Appearances at the U.S. Supreme Court from the Oyez Project

1955 births
Living people
20th-century American lawyers
21st-century American lawyers
21st-century American judges
American legal scholars
Federalist Society members
Harvard Law School faculty
Judges of the United States Court of Appeals for the Tenth Circuit
Law clerks of the Supreme Court of the United States
People associated with Kirkland & Ellis
Michigan State University alumni
Stanford Law School faculty
United States court of appeals judges appointed by George W. Bush
University of Chicago faculty
University of Chicago Law School alumni
University of Utah faculty
Utah lawyers
Facebook Oversight Board members